William Goberd was an English priest in the first half of the 16th century.

Goberd was educated at Magdalen College, Oxford. He held livings at Bicknor and Lydney. He became Treasurer of Hereford Cathedral in 1513, and Archdeacon of Shropshire in 1515, dying later that year.

References

Year of birth unknown
1515 deaths
Alumni of Magdalen College, Oxford
Archdeacons of Shropshire
16th-century English people